Riadh Frioui (born 29 July 1997) is a Tunisian football midfielder who currently plays for ES Métlaoui.

References

1997 births
Living people
Tunisian footballers
JS Kairouan players
ES Métlaoui players
Association football midfielders
Tunisian Ligue Professionnelle 1 players